NCS: Manhunt is a British television crime drama series, starring David Suchet, and based on the National Crime Squad. Created by Malcolm McKay, the series premiered with a two-part pilot episode on BBC One on 26 March 2001. A full series of six episodes debuted on 4 March 2002, and concluded on 19 March 2002. Despite the series' popularity, and strong viewing figures, a second series was never commissioned. Notably, neither the pilot nor the complete series have ever been issued on DVD, although the series was repeated in its entirety on Forces TV in 2016. The series notably starred Michael Fassbender in one of his earliest television roles, after appearing in Band of Brothers the previous year. Kenneth Cranham and Phyllis Logan also co-starred in the pilot episode.

David Suchet said of his role in the series, "I don't ever recollect reading a script like this and I've certainly never seen anything like it on television before. When I read it, I was mesmerised. It was quite impossible to say no. Borne is probably the most complex character in the team. He is a man who fascinates by being endlessly enigmatic. He uses language sparingly, but with him everything is going on underneath the surface. And in a sense, I'm not playing another detective at all. I'm merely playing a different, complex human being who just happens to be a detective. You may find him in a police station, but I'd like to think that the audience are aching to see him too."

Cast

Regular cast
 David Suchet as Detective Inspector John Borne
 Keith Barron as Detective Superintendent Bob Beausoleil
 Samantha Bond as Detective Sergeant Maureen Picasso
 Melanie Hill as Detective Sergeant Ruby Sparks
 Jonathan Phillips as Detective Sergeant Peter Moon
 Gerard Horan as Detective Constable Charlie Spanish
 Sara Stewart as Detective Constable Mary D'Eye
 Jenny Jules as Detective Constable Karen Bogard-Black
 Ace Bhatti as Detective Constable Johnny Khan
 Paul McKay as Detective Constable Chrissie Crowe
 Guy Scantlebury as Detective Constable Eddie Guerin (Pilot and episodes 1 and 2)
 Michael Fassbender as Detective Constable Jack Silver (Episodes 3–6)

Supporting cast
 Malcolm Tierney as Superintendent Charlie Vanne (Pilot)
 Phyllis Logan as Inspector Anne Warwick (Pilot)
 Kenneth Cranham as Ricky Valesi (Pilot)
 Steven Berkoff as George Rolf (Episodes 1 and 2)
 Anita Dobson as Jean Harris (Episodes 1 and 2)
 Zawe Ashton as Mia Davis (Episodes 1 and 2)
 Ralph Brown as Ray Du Barriatte (Episodes 1, 2 and 6)
 Daniel Mays as Danny Bird (Episodes 1 and 2)
 Nicky Henson as Vincent Fairey (Episodes 3 and 4)
 Michael McKell as Lee Wilde (Episodes 3 and 4)
 Steve Speirs as Benny Luck (Episode 6)

Episodes

Pilot (2001)

Series (2002)

References

External links

2000s British police procedural television series
2001 British television series debuts
2002 British television series endings
English-language television shows